Profanity in Mandarin Chinese most commonly involves sexual references and scorn of the object's ancestors, especially their mother. Other Mandarin insults accuse people of not being human. Compared to English, scatological and blasphemous references are less often used. In this article, unless otherwise noted, the traditional character will follow its simplified form if it is different.

Sex

Penis
As in English, many Mandarin Chinese slang terms involve the genitalia or other sexual terms. Slang words for the penis refer to it literally, and are not necessarily negative words:

  (IM abbreviation: J8/G8) = cock (used as early as the Yuan Dynasty), also written 𣬠𣬶
  (IM: JJ/GG) = roughly equivalent of "thingy" as it is the childish version of the above.
 , baby talk, "tool".
  = roughly equivalent of "wee-wee" (lit. "little younger brother") IM: DD
  = roughly equivalent of "the package" (lit. "thing under crotch")
 = penis (scientific)
  ( or substituted by ) = dick (the same character also means to have sexual intercourse in Cantonese, alternatively written as )
  same as "", used in some southern areas such as Fujian and Guangdong. Also written as "" in Cantonese.
  = penis (lit. "second in the family", "little brother")
  = penis, usually seen in novels/fictions. (lit. "That thing", "that matter")
  = used by people (mostly children) in Taiwan, Malaysia, and Singapore to mean penis (lit. "little bird"), often simplified to 
  = turtle's head (glans/penis)
  = foreskin (literally: wrapper)
  = originally meant male pubic hair, but means an unprivileged nobody. Formerly Internet slang, now a popular word often used in self-mockery (lit. "dick silk/wire")

Based on regular sound change rules, we would expect the word for bird in Mandarin to be pronounced , but Mandarin dialects' pronunciations of the word for bird evolved to an alveolar nasal initial, likely as a means of taboo avoidance, giving contemporary  while most dialects in the south retain the Middle Chinese alveolar stop initial and the homophony or near homophony of these words.

Vagina
There appear to be more words for vagina than for penis. The former are more commonly used as insults and are also more aggressive and have negative connotations:

  (IM: B) = cunt
  = cunt (Taiwanese Mandarin, near-homophone of Hokkien profanity chi-bai)
  = pussy (lit. "little younger sister", see. xiaodidi above)
  = pussy (lit. "abalone" due to its flesh having a superficial resemblance to a vulva)
  (IM: 2B) = fucking idiot or inbred (lit. "double vagina"; general insult)
  = stupid person (lit. "stupid cunt") IM: SB
  = bitch (lit. "lewd cunt")
  = stinking cunt
  = rotten cunt
  = vagina (scientific)
  = vulva (scientific)
  = vagina (lit. "garden of peach blossoms")
  = poser (lit. "pretending to be the cunt")
  = Literally "The Eldest Aunt", a popular mainland contemporary term which refers to menstruation. Comparable to 'A visit from Aunt Flo'

Brothel frequenter
  literally, lewd worms. Men who enjoy frequent sex with women.
  literally, old frequenter of prostitutes.  There is actually a verb for frequenting prostitutes in Chinese.

Prostitution
In addition to the above expressions used as insults directed against women, other insults involve insinuating that they are prostitutes:

  = (female) prostitute
  = stinking whore
  (literally "selling tofu") is a euphemism for prostitution.
This connotation does not apply outside of the People's Republic of China.
  (lit. "chick") = (female) prostitute
  (lit. "duck") = (male) prostitute

Mistress
  = mistress (lit. "little wife" or "little old women"). " thus often carries with it a degree of familiarity.
 , lit., "little wife" (but definitely not to be mistaken for "the little woman", which can be a way of referring to a wife in English).
 , lit., "the second mistress" (means a concubine, a kept woman).
 , lit., "little three" (means a mistress, since she is supposed to be the third person in a relationship).

Breasts
  (literally cat's purring "meow meow") is a euphemism for breast.
  (literally "big tofu") slang for large breasts, more prevalent in Guangdong
  (literally "steamed bun") also refers to a woman's breasts; as mantou is typical of northern Chinese cuisine this term is used primarily in northern China.
  (literally "wave" or "undulating", but sometimes suggested to be derived from "ball" which has a similar pronunciation) = boobs.
 ; lit. "happy long life"
  = boobies.
  = motorboating (lit. "facial cleanser", where "" serves as both slang for breasts and a thick liquid, and pressing one's head between a woman's breasts vaguely resembles washing one's face)
  (Beijing slang)
  = big tits, likely reborrowing from Japanese.
  (literally "airport") = flat breasts
  – literally "aircraft carrier", referring to a flat chest.
  means Princess of Peace; this was the actual title of a real princess. However  means great or extreme and  means flat or level. Hence, this phrase is a double entendre, i.e., "Extremely Flat Princess."

Anus

 ; literally "chrysanthemums") – anus. This term comes from the observation that the shape of an anal opening resembles a chrysanthemum flower, where the skin folds are comparable to the flower's small, thin petals. Although nowadays this usage is a commonplace amongst Chinese netizens, the euphemism as such has existed in Chinese literature from much earlier.
  – anal orifice, asshole
  – anus (medical term), literally "door of anus".
  – anus. literally "back yard".

Masturbation
Male masturbation, at least, has several vulgar expressions, in addition to two formal/scientific ones that refer to both male and female masturbation (  and  ):

  = male masturbation (lit. "firing a handgun")
  = male masturbation (lit. "hitting an airplane"). A term which originated from the Cantonese language.
  = male masturbation (lit. "stroke the pipe")
  = male masturbation, also "stroking the pipe"
  = male masturbation (lit., "play with little brother")
  = male masturbation (lit. "five beating one")
  = male masturbation (lit. "to visit five girls", a reference to the fact that a human hand has five fingers)
  = masturbation (lit. private pleasure / enjoy yourself)
  = fingering
  = dildo (lit. fake penis)
  = vibrator (lit. massage stick)

Foreplay
  = oral intercourse (scientific); informally euphemized in text as "" ( due to its visual resemblance)
  = blowjob (lit. "blow service")
  = blowjob ("play flute")
  = Taiwanese slang for blowjob
  = deep throating
  = mouth fucking (a form of blowjob)
  = face fucking
  = teabagging
  = cunnilingus (scientific)
  = muff diving (lit. "licking vagina")
  = muff diving (lit. "evaluating jade")
  = eat pussy (borrowed from English)
  = facesitting
  = anilingus (scientific)
  = anilingus (lit. "drilling for poisonous dragons")

Sexual intercourse

  = to fuck (the first shown Chinese character is made up of components meaning "to enter" and "the flesh"; the second is the etymological graph, with the standard meaning being "to do exercise")
  = to do = to fuck (alternatively  , to do) or from Hokkien , also means fuck.
  (lit. "to enter)" = to fuck. The meaning is obvious and in normal contexts  is pronounced . But when it is used as a coarse expression, the "u" is elided. See , vol. 3, p. 3257.
  = anal sex. (lit. burst the chrysanthemum (anus)), i.e., insert the penis into the anus
  = to ejaculate (lit. to fire the cannon)
  = Sexual orgasm (lit. high tide, also used to describe a climax point in other domains)
  (）= to have sex (lit. to insert, to penetrate)
  = to have sex (lit. "making stir-fried rice")
  = to have sex (onomatopoeia for grunting noises made when exerting effort, heave-ho)
  = to have sex (lit. "a round of a fight", but usually made into number of rounds if having sex multiple times, such as "" or "round 3 of fighting" to mean "3rd time having sex")
  = rape
  = sodomy
  = to ejaculate (scientific)
  = female ejaculation; squirt (lit. "orgasm blow")
  = intermammary sex; tit-fuck (lit. "breast intercourse")
  = ejaculating on a woman's chest after intramammary sex; pearl necklace
  = moaning in bed

Insults
As in English, a vulgar word for the sexual act is used in insults and expletives:

 cào = fuck (the variant character  was in use as early as the Ming dynasty in the novel Jin Ping Mei). 操 is often used as a substitute for 肏 in print or on the computer, because 肏 was until recently often not available for typesetting or input.
 cào nǐ zǔzōng shíbā dài = "Fuck your ancestors to the eighteenth generation"; the cào 肏, in modern Standard Chinese, is often substituted with 肏; the cào 肏 (fuck) has been substituted for 抄, which meant "confiscate all the property of someone and of his entire extended family." In China, ancestor worship is an important aspect of society, as a result of Confucianism, where filial piety and respect for one's ancestors is considered crucial; insulting one's ancestors is a sensitive issue and is generally confronting.

Mother
Insulting someone's mother is also common:
 tā māde (IM: TMD) = [fuck] his mother's, or frequently used as "Shit!" (lit. "his mother's"; in the 1920s the famous writer Lu Xun joked that this should be China's national curse word)
 tā mā bāzi ( his mother's clitoris. Lu Xun differentiates this expression from the previous one. This one can be said in admiration, whereas "tā māde" is just abusive. See his essay, "On 'His mother's'" (論他媽的).
 tā māde niǎo = goddamn it (lit. "his mother's dick";  literally is "bird", but used here as a euphemism for diǎo; ; "penis")
 qù nǐ nǎinaide = your mother (lit. "go to your grandma")
 qù nǐ māde = your mother (lit. "go to your mom")
 qù nǐde = fuck you, screw off, shut up (used jokingly and is considered mild and not insulting)
 nǐ māde bī = your mother's cunt
 cào nǐ mā (IM: CNM) / cào nǐ niáng = fuck your mother
 cào nǐ māde bī = fuck your mother's cunt
 gàn nǐ mā / gàn nǐ lǎo mǔ = fuck your mother (gàn is similar to the English euphemism do)
 gàn nǐ niáng = fuck your mother (Taiwanese Mandarin influenced by the regional vernacular Taiwanese Minnan 姦汝娘 (kàn-lín-nió); also "幹您娘")

Other relatives
 nǐ èr dàyé de = damn on your second uncle. This is a part of local Beijing slang.
 lǎolao = grandmother-from-mother-side. In Beijing dialect, this word is used for "Never!".
 tā nǎinai de = His grandmother-from-father-side!

Turtles and eggs
The 中文大辭典 Zhōng wén dà cí diǎn (Encyclopedic Dictionary of the Chinese Language)), discusses 王八 (wáng bā) in vol. 6 p. 281. "Wáng bā" is the term that is usually written casually for the slur that means something like "son of a bitch."

A "wángbādàn 忘/王八蛋" is the offspring of a woman lacking virtue. Another meaning of 王八 is 鼈 biē, fresh-water turtle. Turtle heads reemerging from hiding in the turtle's shell look like the glans emerging from the foreskin, and turtles lay eggs. So a "wang ba" is a woman who has lost her virtue, and a "wang ba dan" is the progeny of such a woman, a turtle product, but, figuratively, also a penis product. 龜頭 (guītóu, "turtle head") can refer to the glans of the penis.

"Wáng bā 王八" originally got switched over from another "忘八 wàng bā" (one that referred to any very unvirtuous individual) because of a man with the family name Wáng 王 who picked up the nickname 賊王八 zéi Wáng bā ("the thieving Wang Eight") but for being a dastard, not for being a bastard. The dictionary doesn't say, but he may have been the eighth Wang among his siblings. Anyway, he became "crook Wang eight" and the term stuck and spread just as "Maverick" did in English. There is a pun here because of the earlier expression 忘八 wàng bā used to describe (1) any person who forgets/disregards the eight virtues, (2) an un-virtuous woman, i.e., one who sleeps around. The first meaning applied to the dastardly Wang, but the family name got "stuck" to the second, sexual, term.

Illegitimacy
Many insults imply that the interlocutor's mother or even grandmother was promiscuous. The turtle is emblematic of the penis and also of promiscuous intercourse, because turtles were once thought to conceive by thought alone, making paternity impossible to prove. Eggs are the progeny of turtles and other lower animals, so the word dàn (蛋) is a metonym for offspring.

 wángbā / wàngbā = soft-shell turtle; this was an insult as early as the Song Dynasty.
 wángbādàn / wàngbāgāozi = bastard (lit: "Wang eight eggs child.")
 guī sūnzi / guī érzi = bastard (lit. "turtle grandson" and "turtle son")
 dài lǜmàozi = to be a cuckold (lit. "wear a green hat," supposedly because male brothel workers in the Tang Dynasty had to wear green hats)
 zázhǒng = mixed seed, half-caste, half breed, hybrid, illegitimate child.  There are proper terms for children of mixed ethnicity, but this is not one of them.
 hún dàn = individual who has at least two biological fathers and one biological mother, the idea being that the mother mated with two or more males in quick succession and a mosaic embryo was formed.
 hún zhang wángbā dàn = similar to turtle egg, see above.

Suck up
 chóngyáng mèiwài Chinese who ass kiss foreigners.
 fànjiàn asking to be disrespected.
 zhāo biǎn asking to be kicked.
 dīsānxiàsì low (lit. "low three down four")
 gǒutuǐzi someone's dog.
 pāi mǎ pì to suck up, to be a toady (lit. patting a horse's butt).

Disability
References to various kinds of disability are sometimes used against both abled and disabled people as an insult. 
 shén jīng bìng Insanity. Literally "disease of the nervous system", or having problems with one's nervous system. In China, imbalance of the nervous system is commonly associated with mental illness (for instance, 神经衰弱 Shenjing shuairuo, literally "weakness of the nervous system", is a more socially accepted medical diagnosis for someone who, in the West, would have normally been diagnosed with schizophrenia, due to the social stigma against mental illness in China). Now the word is used quite generally when insulting someone whose actions seem odd, rude, offensive, or inappropriate.
 fāfēng going insane.
 biàntài Perverted, deviant, abnormal. 
 nǎocán lit. brain crippled. Intelligence or mental capacity. 
 bái chī idiot, someone with mental retardation.
 bái mù stupid. Literally, white-eyed, blind. Here it means not understanding the situation and reacting in a wrong way as a result.
 bèn dàn Idiot (lit. stupid egg).
 chǔn dàn  Stupid (lit. stupid egg).
 chǔn zhū Stupid (lit. dumb pig).
 chǔn lǘ  Dumbass
 dà nǎo jìn shuǐ water leaked in the brain, a possible reference to hydrocephalus.
 shǎ zi  Blockhead
 zìbì autistic. Neutral term for people who are actually autistic, but also used as an mildly offensive term for socially awkward people. 
 xǐhān The term is coined by a Taiwanese NGO as a positive term for mentally disabled people, but has become a negative term when used on a neurotypical person. 
 cánfèi crippled. 
 bǒzi crippled. 
  quézi crippled. 
 xiāzi blind. The word is used either as an obsolete and politically incorrect term for visually impaired people, or as an insult when an abled person fails to see something.  
 lóngzi deaf. Similar to the above but for hearing instead of vision.

Buttocks
While there are vulgar expressions in English referring to the buttocks or rectum, there are no real equivalents in Mandarin. Pìgu yǎn or pìyǎnr (屁眼兒/屁眼儿), one expression for anus, is not vulgar, but it occurs in various curses involving an imperforate anus
 sǐ pì yǎn damned asshole.
 jiào nǐ shēng háizi méi pìgu yǎn – literally, "May your child be born with an imperforate anus"; sometimes méi pìgu yǎn is used as an epithet similar to "damned". This phrase is commonly heard in some TVB dramas in the Cantonese translation.
 jiào nǐ shēng háizi zhǎng zhì chuāng (叫你生孩子长痔疮) – "May your child be born with hemorrhoids"
 wǒ kào ( or ) – "Well fuck me!", "Fuck!", "Fuckin' awesome!" or "Holy shit!" (Originally from Taiwan, this expression has spread to the mainland, where it is generally not considered to be vulgar. 尻 originally meant "butt.")

Age
 lǎo bù sǐde 老不死的—"old [but] won't die"—is used as an angry comment directed against old people who refuse to die and so clog up the ladder to promotion in some organization. It is implied that they have outlived their usefulness, which conveys a deeper meaning of that person inconveniencing or hogging a resource or benefit that is beneficial to the insulter (such as a job promotion) by being alive; thus the insulter wishes for their death. The expression comes from the Analects of Confucius where the Master complains against those who engage in heterodox practices aimed at assuring them extreme longevity. In the original these individuals are described as "lǎo ér bù sǐ" (老而不死), i.e., it is said that they "are old but won't die."
 lǎo zéi 老賊= lǎo bù sǐde
 lǎo tóuzi, literally "old head," it refers in a somewhat slighting way to old men. Its usage is rather like such expressions as "old geezer"  in English.
 lǎo tài pó 老太婆, old hag.
 xiǎo guǐ 小鬼," little devil," is used familiarly and (usually) affectionately (c.f. "rascal" in English).
 xiǎo tù zǎizi 小兔崽子," little rabbit kitten," refers to someone young. Its usage is rather like such expressions as "little brat" in English.
 rǔ xiù wèi gān Literally "(the) smell (of) milk is not dry (=gone) yet," wet behind the ears.
 lǎo wán gù 老顽固, an old arrogant man.

Promiscuity
As in the West, highly sexual women have been stigmatized. Terms for males who sleep around are rare.

 chāng fù = bitch/whore
 húli jīng = bitch (overly seductive woman or a golddigger; lit. "fox spirit")
 sānbā = airhead, braggart, slut (lit. "three eight"). Used to insult women. One derivation claims that at one point in the Qing Dynasty, foreigners were only permitted to circulate on the eighth, eighteenth, and twenty-eighth of each month, and the Chinese deprecated these aliens by calling them , but others claim  refers to March 8: International Women's Day. In Taiwan, the term has less of a misogynistic connotation, and means "silly" or "airhead."
 gōng gòng qì chē = slut (lit. "public bus") used for a woman who sleeps around, as in "everyone has had a ride"
 biǎozi = whore, slut
 jiàn nǚ rén = bitch, cheap woman
 huā huā gōngzǐ = playboy, notorious cheater (lit. "Flower-Flower Prince")
 sè láng = womanizer, sex maniac (lit. "Coloured Wolf", in this context the adjective "colour" is a euphemism for "lewd")
 sè guǐ = pervert (lit. "Sex Ghost", 色 can be read as both 'Color' and 'Sex')

Positive connotations
Occasionally, slang words with a negative connotation are turned around and used positively:

 wǒ cào = An expression of impressed surprise or approval, akin to "fuck me", "holy fuck" or "holy shit!" in English (lit. "I fuck") Alternatively, "我靠" (wǒ kào, "I lean on". IM:KAO) or "哇靠" (wa kào) is used when the subject intends on being less obscene, such as when speaking in public.
This phrase also has many alternative forms, including NB, 牛B, 牛比, 牛鼻 ("cow's nose"), as well as euphemisms such as 牛叉/牛X niúchā. It can also just be shortened to 牛.
 diǎo / niǎo = cock; this was an insult as long ago as the Jin Dynasty. Now it sometimes also means "fucking cool" or "fucking outrageous", thanks in large part to the pop star Jay Chou. Because of the substitution of "niǎo" which means bird, sometimes English-speaking Chinese in Malaysia sometimes use "birdie" as a euphemism for "penis" for small children. "鸟人" (bird man) sometimes has a derogative meaning as a "wretch", but also often used between close friends as affectionate appellation like "fellow".
 diǎo sī = originally meant to mean male pubic hair, but means an unprivileged nobody. Originally an Internet slang, now a popular word often used in self-mockery (lit. "dick silk/wire")

Mixed-up
Other insults include the word hùn, which means "mixed-up", or hùn, which means "muddy":

 hùnzhàng = bullshit, damn
 hùndàn ( / ) = prick
 hūndàn = prick
 hùnqiú = prick
 mǎmǎhǔhǔ   = sloppy, careless

Eggs
Perhaps due to the influence of wángbādàn, dàn ("egg") is used in a number of other insults in addition to hùndàn:

 bèndàn = dummy, fool, idiot (lit. "dumb egg")
 chǔn dàn()= dummy, fool
 dǎodàn ( / ) = "to cause trouble"
 gǔndàn = get out of sight!
 huàidàn = a wicked person. Literally a bad egg.
 hútú dàn = confused/clueless person (a sucker)
 qióngguāng dàn = a poor/penniless person
 chě dàn = nonsense, bullshit, bollocks

Melons
The word guā (melon or gourd) is also used in insults:

 shǎguā (also shǎzi) = dummy, fool, idiot. The term was in use as early as the Yuan Dynasty.
 dāiguā (also dāizi) = dummy, fool, idiot.

In addition to the senses listed above, the "melon" is a metonym for the womb, and a "broken melon" refers to a female's lost virginity.

Sticks
The noun  gùn, stick/staff is often used to refer to someone who is morally corrupted.
 ègùn (惡棍 / 恶棍) = bad guy, bully, villain (lit. "evil stick")
 shéngùn (神棍) = fake fortune teller (lit. "god stick")
 dǔgùn (賭棍 / 赌棍) = rogue gambler (lit. "gamble stick")
 dégùn (德棍) = fascist (lit. "german stick")

Ghosts and spirits
The noun for "ghost" 鬼 is often used to mock someone with some bad habit. The mocking tone may not be very serious though.
 jiǔguǐ (酒鬼) = drinker, alcoholic
 zuìguǐ (醉鬼) = drunkard
 xiǎoqì guǐ (小气鬼) = tightwad, cheapskate; selfish
 dǎnxiǎo guǐ (胆小鬼) = coward

精 "nonhuman spirit in a human's form" is usually for insulting some cunning people.
 húli jīng = vixen (overly seductive woman or a golddigger; lit. "fox spirit")
 mǎpì jīng (马屁精) = flatterer (lit. "horse fart spirit")
 lǎo yāo pó (老妖婆) = evil old witch
 yāojing (妖精) = alluring woman; also fairy or goblin
 yāoguài (妖怪) = monster, demon
 rényāo (人妖) = shemale, trans woman (lit. "human demon")
 tàiguó rényāo (泰國人妖) = Thai shemale (lit. Thailand human demon; usually used as a stronger insult than merely calling someone a shemale)

Useless
 méiyòng = useless
 Fèi ("(noun) waste/garbage, (verb) to waste, to throw away") appears in a number of insults:
 wōnang fèi = loser
 fèi wù= good for nothing
 fèirén = useless person
 fèihuà = nonsense, bullshit, useless talk or chit-chat
 liúmáng = scoundrel, gangster or pervert (the word originally meant vagrant); often used by women to insult men who act aggressively.
 nāozhǒng = coward, useless, or weak person.
 rén zhā = Scum. Someone who is useless and unwanted as garbage.
 wúyòng = literally "useless"
 fàntǒng = useless person. Literally "rice bucket", the connotation being that, like a bucket, the person is only useful for storing food and nothing else.
 er bai wu = haven't got the full deck (see 250).

Boasting
 bàn píngzi cù: literally "a half-empty bottle of vinegar", used to address a person with limited professional expertise.
 chuīniú bī: lit. inflating (blowing air into) a cow's vagina. Used to address bragging activities. Often bowdlerized to chuīniú when speaking in public or in the presence of children.
 chī bǎole chēng de: lit. eats too much. Used to refer weird, nonsense or illogical deeds.
 chī bǎo fàn méi shì gàn (吃飽飯沒事干) = same as chī bǎo le chēng de, but the literal meaning is different (lit. "just finished eating and there's nothing to do")

Cruelty
 shārén bù zhǎyǎn stone cold killer (lit. "kills people without blinking")
 huǒyǎn xiéshén evil spirit.
 dà mó tóu a very wicked and powerful man.
  sàng xīn bìng kuǎng crazy cruelty.
  liáng xīn bèi gǒu chī le conscience was eaten by dog.

Face
Because shame or "face" is important in Chinese culture, insulting someone as "shameless" is much stronger than in English:

 bú yàoliǎn = shameless, lit. "doesn't want face," i.e., "discards his face, does not seek to maintain a good status in society".
 bú yào bīliǎn = fuсking shameless, lit. "doesn't want сunt face," i.e., "discards his fuсking face"

Girlish
 niángniangqiāng is a pejorative used to describe Chinese males who are extremely effeminate in their speaking style. It is related to the term sājiào (to whine), but is predominantly said of males who exhibit a rather "girlish" air of indecisiveness and immaturity. Adherents of both tend to lengthen sentence-final particles while maintaining a higher-pitched intonation all throughout.
 tàijiàn or gōnggong – Eunuch. From the stereotypes of Imperial eunuchs seen in TV shows in China (with a high, feminine voice). Men with higher voices are called eunuchs.
 nǚ qì, female lifebreath. A man having the psychological attributes of a woman is said to exhibit "nǚ qì," i.e., is said to be effeminate.
 pì jīng roughly meaning ass fairy. It is often used as a derogatory for feminine gay people.

Boyish
 nán rén pó a female who behaves like a male. Tomboy.
 mu ye cha a female Yaksha, an ugly and rough female; often domineering in personality.

Inhuman
Other insults accuse people of lacking qualities expected of a human being:

 chùsheng = animal; it literally means "beast", a likely reference to the Buddhist belief that rebirth as an animal is the result of karma conditioned by stupidity and prejudice. The word is also used in Japanese, where it is pronounced "chikushō", often used as an expletive, akin to "hell!"
 qín shòu = beasts (lit.: "bird and animal"), often used as qín shòu bù rú = worse than beasts
 nǐ bú shì rén = you're not human (lit.: "you are not a person"). This could also mean that the person is so mean/cruel that they are not human. In this instance, one can say "你还是人吗" nǐ hái shì rén ma (lit.: "are you still human")
 nǐ shì shénme dōngxi = you're less than human, literally: What kind of object are you? (compares the level of a person to that of an object)
 nǐ búshì dōngxi = you're less than human (implies less worth than an object)
 bùyàoliǎn de dōngxi = you're shameless and less than human (lit.: "you are a thing that has no shame")
 jiànhuò = lit. "cheap goods" ("[you] despicable creature!")
 sāohuò = lit. "lewd goods" ("[you] lewd creature!")
 shuǐhuò = lit. "parallel import"

Death
Sǐ ("dead", "cadaverous," or, less precisely, "damn(ed)") is used in a number of insults:

 sǐ guǐ lit., "dead imp," "dead demon," "dead ghost". Used as a term of contempt.
 sǐ sān bā / chòu sān bā, lit., stinking (derogatory term for woman) bitch
 sǐ bù yào liǎn = shameless (lit.: "[you] shameless corpse")
 qù sǐ = Lit. "Go die!", comparable to the English phrase "Go to hell!"
 sǐ yā tóu 死丫頭, lit., dead serving wench. – This term is no longer in common use. It appears in early novels as a deprecating term for young female bondservants. The "ya" element refers to a hair style appropriate to youths of this sort.
 gāi sǐ damned, damn it! (lit. should die)
 zhǎo sǐ: literally "look [for] death" (i.e. "looking to die"). Roughly equivalent to the English phrase 'asking for trouble'.

Excrement
The words "" (shǐ) (= shit, turd, dung), "" (fèn) (= manure, excrement) and " (= stool, poop)" (dà biàn), all mean feces but vary from blunt four letter to family-friendly, respectively. They can all be used in compound words and sentences in a profane manner.

Originally, the various Mandarin Chinese words for "excrement" were less commonly used as expletives, but that is changing. Perhaps because farting results in something that is useless even for fertilizer: "fàng pì" (lit. "to fart") is an expletive in Mandarin. The word "pì" (lit. "fart") or the phrase is commonly used as an expletive in Mandarin (i.e. "bullshit!").

 qù chī dà biàn [Go] Eat shit! (By itself,  is neither an expletive nor does it have the same effect as 'shit' in English.)
 chī shǐ = Eat shit!
 shǐ dàn Lit., "shit egg", a turd.
 fàng pì = bullshit, nonsense, lie (literally "to fart"; used as an expletive as early as the Yuan dynasty.
 fàng nǐ mā de pì = you are f—ing bullshitting (lit. "release your mother's fart")
 'ge pì (个屁) = A common variation of 放屁, also meaning "bullshit" (as in lies, c.f. English "my ass!"). This term is used because "fang pi" can be taken literally to mean Flatulence. Often tacked on to the end of a sentence, as in "XYZ 个屁!"
 méi pì yòng = no damn use (lit. "to have no fart use")
 yǒu pì yòng = no damn use, to be of damn-all use (lit. "to have fart use")
 pìhuà = bullshit, nonsense (lit. "fart word")
 nǐ zài jiǎng shén me pì huà = What the shit/fuck are you saying
 pì shì = a mere nothing; also guānwǒpìshì= I don't give a damn, it means damn all to me
 qí yán fèn tǔ yě – an expression in Classical Chinese that means, "His words are [nothing but] excrement." (See Giles, A Chinese-English Dictionary.)
 yǒu huà kuài shuō, yǒu pì kuài fàng 有話快說，有屁快放 = an expression meaning to stop beating around the bush (lit. If you have something to say, hurry up and say it; if you have a fart, hurry up and let it out)
 shǐ bǎ ba – Children's slang term for faeces, similar to English "poo-poo" or "brownie". A variant of this term is 㞎㞎 (bǎ ba), while  (biàn bian) is also used as a children's term, albeit less frequently used.
 pìtóu = fart.

Animals
In a 1968 academic study of Chinese pejorative words, more than a third of the 325-term corpus of abusive expressions compare the insulted person with an animal, with the worst curses being "animal" generally, "pig, dog, animal", or "animal in dress", which deny the person of human dignity. The expressions contain metaphorical references to the following domesticated animals: dogs, cows, and chickens (12 or 11 terms each), (8 times), horse (4), cat (3), and duck (2), and one each to sheep, donkey and camel.  A variety of wild animals are used in these pejorative terms, and the most common are monkey (7 times) and tiger (5 times), symbolizing ugliness and power respectively.

Dogs
The fact that many insults are prefaced with the Mandarin Chinese word for dog attest to the animal's low status:

 gǒuzǎizi (/) = son of dog (English equivalent: "son of a bitch")
 gǒu pì = bullshit, nonsense (lit. "dog fart"); in use as early as 1750 in the Qing Dynasty novel The Scholars.
 nǐ ge gǒu pì = what you said is bullshit. Also "nǐ ge pì"()or simply "pì"().
 gǒu pì bù tōng dog fart + does not (come out at the end of the tube) communicate = incoherent, nonsensical
 fàng nǐ mā de gǒu pì = what you said is fucking bullshit (lit. "release your mother's dog fart")
 fàng nǐ mā de gǒu chòu pì = what you said is fucking bullshit (lit. "release your mother's dog stinky fart")
 gǒu niáng yǎng de = son of a bitch (lit. "raised by a dog mother")
 gǒurìde = son of a bitch (from Liu Heng's story "Dogshit Food", lit. "dog fuck" 日 is here written for 入, which when pronounced rì means "fuck".)
 gǒushǐ duī = a person who behaves badly (lit. "a pile of dog shit"); gǒushǐ, or "dog shit", was used to describe people of low moral character as early as the Song dynasty. Due to Western influence, as well as the similar sound, this has become a synonym for bullshit in some circles.
 gǒuzázhǒng = literally "mongrel dog", a variation on zázhǒng, above.
 zǒugǒu = lapdog, often translated into English as "running dog", it means an unprincipled person who helps or flatters other, more powerful and often evil people; in use in this sense since the Qing Dynasty. Often used in the 20th century by communists to refer to client states of the United States and other capitalist powers.
 gǒutuǐzi / gǒutuǐ = Variant of zǒugǒu, lit. "dog thigh"
 hǎ bā gǒu (哈巴狗) = someone who incessantly follows someone around, and is usually seen as a sycophant. (lit: "pug dog")

Rabbits
In at least one case, rabbit is part of an insult:
 xiǎotùzǎizi = son of a rabbit (quite ironically, this insult is often used by parents to insult their children)

Horse
 mǎzi = a derogatory word for girlfriend. (Possibly influenced by U.S. slang, "filly," used for any girl.)

Bird
The Chinese word for bird "niǎo"() was pronounced as "diǎo" in ancient times, which rhymes with  meaning penis or sexual organ. It also sounds the same as "penis" in several Chinese dialects. Thus, bird is often associated with 'fuck', 'penis' or 'nonsense'：
 wǒ niǎo nǐ = I fuck you (Beijing dialect)
 wǒ niǎo tā de = damn fuck; fuck him
 niǎo huà = bullshit, fucking words ; nǐ zài jiǎng shénme niǎo huà = What fucking words are you talking about?
 niǎo rén = bastard, asshole. This word commonly appears in Water Margin, a Ming dynasty Classical Chinese Novel.
 niǎo shì = mere nothing; also guān wǒ niǎo shì = I don't care a damn, it means damn all to me

Tigress
A tigress or 母老虎 (Mǔ lǎohǔ) refers to a fierce woman, usually someone's strict wife.

Dinosaur
A dinosaur or 恐龙 (Kǒnglóng) has been used as Internet slang to describe an ugly girl.

Insect 
 wútóu cāngyíng (無頭蒼蠅) = someone running around with no sense of direction (lit: "headless fly", or similar to "chicken with its head cut off" in English)
 hudu chong (糊涂虫) = absent-minded person, a scatterbrain (lit. "confused insect"), compare with wútóu cāngyíng
 gēn pì chóng (跟屁蟲) = someone that aimlessly follows someone around, usually for the purpose of flattery (lit: "butt-chasing insect")

Contempt
Certain words are used for expressing contempt or strong disapproval:
 qiáobùqǐ = To look down upon or to hold in contempt.
 wǒpēi = I boo in disapproval. Pēi 呸 is a spoken onomatopoeia that represents the action of spitting.

Divinity
 wēnshén = troublemaker (literally "plague god"). Compares the insulted person to a disliked god.
 wǒ de tiān a  = Oh my God (literally "Oh my sky").

Miscellaneous
Some expressions are harder to explain:

 èrbǎiwǔ = stupid person/idiot (see 250) Note that the number 250 would normally be pronounced liangbǎiwǔ.
 shūdāizi, roughly equivalent to "bookworm" or, possibly, "nerd". It is used to portray a studious person as lacking either hands-on experience or social skills. Often used academically to describe one who is too by the book, and unable to adapt to changing circumstances that invalidate book theory. Unlike "nerd", shūdāizi is rarely used in the context of hobbies.
 bì zuǐ, = Shut up!

Action specific
Some expressions represent offensive insults involving some kind of actions:

 gǔnkāi = go to hell! (lit. roll or roll away)
 nǐgěiwǒgǔn = get out of my sight! (lit. roll for me!)
 gǔndàn = scram, get out! (lit. "roll[ing] egg")
 gǔnduzi = get out of here. (lit. "Roll over, calf.")
 gǔnnǐmādedàn() = get the fuck out of here! fuck off! (lit. "Roll your mother's egg.")
 gǔnnǐmābī = get the fuck out of here! fuck off! (lit. "Roll to your mother's c---.")

Region specific
Many locations within China have their own local slang, which is scarcely used elsewhere.
 nǐ yā tǐng de (你丫挺的) – Local slang from Beijing, meaning "you son of a bitch!"
 gàn nǐ xiǎo BK de (干你小BK的) – Local slang from Tianjin, meaning "go fuck your 'thing'", where "BK" refers to male genitalia. However, when insulting females, "马B" is used instead.
 xiǎo yàng le ba (小样了吧) – Originating from Southern China. Said upon someone's misfortunes, similar to "haha" or "suck that".
 shén me niǎo – From the northeastern Heilongjiang, although also used in the South. Used similar to "what the fuck?"
 fāgé (发格) – Used in Shanghai, direct transliteration from English "fuck".
 èrbǎdāo (二把刀) – Beijing slang for a good-for-nothing; klutz. Literally "double-ended sword", considered a concept which is useless.
 xiǎomì (小蜜) – Beijing slang for a special female friend (literally translated as "little honey"), often used with negative connotations.
 cènà (册那) – Shanghainese for "fuck", similar in usage to 肏 cào albeit less strong.

Racial euphemisms 
Mandarin Chinese has specific terms and racial euphemisms for different ethno-racial groups around the world, and some discriminatory slurs against Chinese representatives from certain governments and backgrounds.

Against Mainlanders 
 zhīnà (支那) — A derogatory term for China (see Shina). It used to be a neutral historic name for China, but later it became a derogatory since it was extensively used by Japanese Invader during Sino-Japanese Wars.
 zhīnàzhū (支那猪) — "Shina pigs", see zhīnà (支那). Mostly used by anti-China diaspora Chinese, Taiwanese and Hongkongers.
 ālùzaǐ (阿陆仔) — Mainlander, a word originated from Southern Min language. A slang term used by Taiwanese people. The word itself is largely neutral, but it was often used in a negative context.
 sǐālù/426 (死阿陆/426) — An alternation of ālùzaǐ (阿陆仔) ，literally means "dead Mainlanders". It's often written as 426, as in Southern Min the word sounds similar to 426. The slang is widely used by anti-China Taiwanese people online.
 huángchóng (蝗虫) — Literally "Locust" or "Insect." The term is mainly used by Hong Kongers, Taiwanese, and Chinese Singaporeans and directed at mainland Chinese immigrants and tourists because they come in large numbers and supposedly end up consuming local resources at the expense of the host native populations.

Against Mainland Communists 
 gòngfei (共匪) — Literally "Communist bandits" referring to communists, or to a larger extent, all Mainlanders and non-Chinese communists. The term has been in use since the Chinese Civil War by the Kuomintang against the Chinese Communist Party, but today reflects the rifts in cross-strait relations.
gòngzei (共贼) — Literally "Communist thieves", referring to the Beijing government, people in the Communist Party, or all Mainlanders.
ā gòng zǐ (阿共仔) — Literally "Commie guy", a derogatory slang term used by Taiwanese against mainland Chinese, which refers to communism as an ad hominem.
gòngcǎndǎng (共慘黨) — By replacing the middle character with "慘", a near-homophone to "產", meaning sad and pitiful, the name of the Communist Party changes to mean "a party which causes everyone to suffer" (lit. "Everyone Suffers Party"). This term has seen increasing usage in internet communities critical of the Chinese Communist Party.

Against Westerners
 baí pí zhū (白皮猪) — "white skin pigs" a slur for white people, as they regarded on the implication that Whites are perceived to be lazier and less diligent in comparison to their Han Chinese counterparts. 
 baí pí (白皮) — "white skins" a slur for white people.
 yáng guǐzi (洋鬼子) — "Foreign devil", a slur for white foreigners.
 guǐlǎo — Borrowed from Cantonese "Gweilo", "devil" or "devil guy", a slur for Westerners in Hong Kong.
 hóng máo guǐzi — "Red fur devil", rude slang term for Caucasians, especially Caucasians from English speaking countries (see ang mo)
 máo zi – Ethnic slur against Russians. (Literally "fur".) Alternatively 红毛子 (hóng máo zi, red (communist) fur), 俄毛子 (é máo zi, Rus fur). Similar concept to "hóng máo guǐzi" above.
 yáng lājī – "Foreign trash", an ethnic slur for unemployed and uneducated foreigners, especially Caucasians from English speaking countries looking to seek jobs in China. The slur is similar to the term White trash, used in the United States.
 mán zi — Literally "foreign barbarians", this historical term, when mixed with the word "south" (南) is also used as an ethnic slur by northern Han Chinese against someone thought to be from southern China.

Against other East Asians

Against Hong Kongers
 gǎng dú (港毒) — a pun on the homophone "港独/港獨" (gǎng dú, literally "Hong Kong independence"), the definition of 毒 (dú) used is "poison". A slur for Hong Kong's people who advocate for Hong Kong's independence, literally meaning "poison of Hong Kong".

Against Japanese

 xiǎo Rìběn (小日本) "Japs" — Literally "little Japan[ese]". This term is still commonly used as a slur toward Japanese among Chinese but it has very little impact left. This term was historically by the Chinese associating the Japanese with dwarfism and the historical lower average stature of Japanese in comparison with the Han Chinese.
 Rìběn guǐzi (日本鬼子) — Literally "Japanese devil". This is used mostly in the context of the Second Sino-Japanese War, when Japan invaded and occupied large areas of China. This is the title of a Japanese documentary on Japanese war crimes during WWII.
 dōngyáng guǐzi — Literally "Oriental devil". An anti-Japanese variant of yáng guǐzi, and similar to Rìběn guǐzi above. (Note that whereas the term 東洋 has the literal meaning of "Orient" in the Japanese language, the characters themselves mean "eastern ocean", and it refers to Japan exclusively in modern Chinese usage—since Japan is the country which lies in the ocean east of China.)
 Wō (倭) — This was an ancient Chinese name for Japan, but was also adopted by the Japanese. Today, its usage in Chinese is usually intended to give a negative connotation (see Wōkòu below). The character is said to also mean "dwarf", although that meaning was not apparent when the name was first used. See Wa (Japan).
 Wōkòu (倭寇) — Originally referred to Japanese pirates and armed sea merchants who raided the Chinese coastline during the Ming Dynasty (see Wokou). The term was adopted during the Second Sino-Japanese War to refer to invading Japanese forces, (similarly to Germans being called Huns). The word is today sometimes used to refer to all Japanese people in extremely negative contexts.
 Rìběn gǒu (日本狗) — Literally "Japanese dogs". The word is used to refer to all Japanese people in extremely negative contexts.
 dà Jiǎopén zú (大腳盆族) — Ethnic slur towards Japanese used predominantly by Northern Chinese, mainly those from the city of Tianjin. Literally "big-feet-like-washbasins race", also punning on the English "Japan".
 huáng jūn — a pun on the homophone "皇军/皇軍" (huáng jūn, literally "Imperial Army"), the definition of 黃 (huáng) used is "yellow". This phrase 黄军/黃軍 ("Yellow Army") was used during World War II to represent Japanese soldiers due to the colour of their uniform. Today, it is used negatively against all Japanese. Since the stereotype of Japanese soldiers is commonly portrayed in war-related TV series in China as short men, with a toothbrush moustache (and sometimes round glasses, in the case of higher ranks), 黄军/黃軍 is also often used to pull jokes on Chinese people with these characteristics, and thus "appear like" Japanese soldiers.
 zì wèi duì — A pun on the homophone "自卫队/自衛隊" (zì wèi duì, literally "Self-Defence Forces"), the definition of 慰 (wèi) used is "to comfort". This phrase is used to refer to Japanese (whose military force is known as "自衛隊") being stereotypically hypersexual, as "自慰队" means "Self-comforting Forces", referring to masturbation. The word 慰 (wèi) also carries highly negative connotations of "慰安妇/慰安婦" (wèi ān fù, "Comfort women"), referring to the use of sex slaves by the Japanese military during World War II.
wěi jūn (伪军）- Literally "pretender army." The word is used as an insult to collaborationist Chinese forces during World War II, but is occasionally used to refer to Japanese forces as well. It is used officially by Chinese historians, and is specifically spoken towards those people, making it a rare and ineffective insult against Japanese people in general.

Against Koreans
 Gāolì bàng zǐ — A neutral term used against all ethnic Koreans . 高丽/高麗 refers to Ancient Korea (Koryo), while 棒子 means "club" or "corncob", referring to how Korean security guards hired by the Japanese during WW2 were not given guns, only clubs/batons as they were untrustworthy. The term is modernized sometimes as 韓棒子 (hán bàng zǐ, "韓" referring to South Korea)
 sǐ bàng zǐ (死棒子) — Literally "dead club" or "dead plank" with the sexual innuendo of a "useless or dead erection"; refer to 高丽棒子 above.
 èr guǐ zǐ (二鬼子) — (See 日本鬼子) During World War II, 二鬼子 referred to Traitors among the Han Chinese hanjian and Koreans in the Imperial Japanese Army, as the Japanese were known as "鬼子" (devils) for massacring innocent children and women. 二鬼子 literally means "second devils". Today, 二鬼子 is used to describe ethnic Koreans who had been absorbed into Japan and joined the Japanese Imperial Army. It is rarely used as a slur in recent times.
 Běihán gòngfěi (北韩共匪) – Literally "North Korean communist bandits". Used by the anti-communists in Taiwan towards the Workers' Party of Korea as well as the North Koreans.

Against Taiwanese
 tái wā / wā wā (台蛙 / 蛙蛙) — Literally "Taiwanese frogs." Taiwanese are seen as 井底之蛙 (Chinese idiom, literally means "a frog in a well", referring to a person with a very limited outlook and experience), and as often holding naïve beliefs about the mainland.
 tái dú (台毒) — a pun on the homophone "台独/台獨" (tái dú, literally "Taiwan independence"), the definition of 毒 (dú) used is "poison". A slur for Taiwanese people who advocate for Taiwanese independence, literally meaning "poison of Taiwan".
 tái bāzi (台巴子) — Literally "Taiwanese penis shaft." A slur and slang term against the Taiwanese. The term originated from Mainland China as a pejorative directed at the Taiwanese.

Against South Asians

Against Indians
 yìndù ā sān (印度阿三) — A euphemism to Indians. It means "Indian, Hassan".
 ā chā (阿差) — A popular term common among the Cantonese in Hong Kong to refer to Indians. The term derives from the frequent uttering of ācchā 'good, fine' by (Northern) Indians (cf. Hindi अच्छा) Originally referring to the Punjabi "singhs" security force who used to work for the British government during colonial era. Nowadays, any South Asian is referred to as "ā chā". In Cantonese, "Ah" means "Dude", so "Ah Cha" means the dude called "Cha". It is not an ethnic slur, it is used because Cantonese cannot pronounce "Indian" as it derives from a Mandarin term that sounds too formal.
 gālí rén (咖喱人) — Literally "curry person." A much more common contemporary term used to refer to Indians, derived from the use of curry in Indian cuisine and the perception that Indians eat food to some Chinese find to give off a strong smell, and to which Indians typically eat with their hands, a practice that many Chinese find to be dirty and unclean. For these two reasons, it is applied as a derogatory term to Indians.

Against Southeast Asians

Against Filipinos
Huanna – a  Hokkien term in literally meaning "foreigner or non-Chinese." Used by most Overseas Chinese to refer generally to indigeneous Southeast Asians and Taiwanese Aborigines. In the Philippines, this term is used by Chinese Filipinos towards indigenous Filipinos.

Against Indonesians
 yìnníbazi ( or ) — lit. "Indonesian mud", an ethnic slur towards that refers a play on "" (Indonesia) and "" (mud), where  are homophones, thus associating Pribumi Indonesians as being primitive, backward, uncivilized, and dirty.

Against Vietnamese
 lǎo yuè – Literally "Old Vietnamese", or "Old Guy from Vietnam". It is not an anti-Vietnamese slur but rather a familial slang term for Vietnamese.
 Xiǎo Yuenán – Literally "little Vietnam[ese]". This can be used in a derogatory context, referring Vietnam's smaller geographical size than China, darker skin tone, and the lower average stature of Vietnamese in comparison with their Han Chinese counterparts.
 Yuenán houzǐ –  Literally means "Vietnamese monkeys." A term used by the Han Chinese to derogatorily refer towards Vietnamese by associating them as being uncivilized, barbaric, dirty, primitive, and backward people. This term also alludes to the historical region of Nam Viet (南越 which in Chinese translates to "land of the southern barbarians"), a province that was ruled by the Han dynasty during the First Chinese domination of Vietnam; when mixed with the word "southern barbarian" (南蠻) is also used as an ethnic slur towards the Vietnamese by the Han Chinese.
 Yuenán gòngfei or Yue gòngfei ( or ) – Literally means "Vietnamese communist bandits". A variation of gòngfei, this was directed at the Viet Cong by anti-communists during the Vietnam War. While rarely used today, this term is still also used by Taiwanese anti-communists to refer to the Communist Party of Vietnam, or Vietnamese Communists in general.

Other
 lǎo mò (老墨) —  Literally "Old Mexican", an ethnic slur used towards Mexicans. 墨 should not be confused with "ink", which bears the same character and pronunciation from "墨" in 墨西哥 (Mexico).
 hēi guǐzi or hēi guǐ — Literally "Black devil", racial slur directed towards  people of Sub-Saharan Black African descent. The term is similar to the English term "nigger" as an ethnic slur directed at blacks.
 tǔbāozi — Literally "Mud baozi/muddy baozi". An insult directed at those seen as uncultured or backward, implying that the insulted person comes from a peasant background. Roughly equivalent to the English phrases "country bumpkin" and "hayseed". The term can also be used without any negative connotations to denote someone who is new, unfamiliar and inexperienced in any profession or activity, roughly similar to the English internet gaming slang "noob."
 xiāngjiāo rén — 'Banana People' – a term used to refer to any person of Overseas Chinese ancestry who have assimilated in the Western World and have lost any true Chinese trait. As the insult implies, they are like bananas: Yellow (Chinese) on the exterior while white (western) on the intrinsically (akin to "Oreo" for African Americans or "coconut" for Hispanic-Americans).

Homosexuality
There are various circumlocutions in Mandarin Chinese for homosexual, and the formal terms are recent additions just as is the direct translation of "masturbation" (hand soiling).

Duànxiù — cut off sleeve, from the story of a ruler whose male favourite fell asleep on the sleeve of his jacket, so when the ruler had to get up to conduct some needed business he cut his sleeve off rather than awaken his lover (See Bret Hinsch, Passions of the Cut Sleeve, p. 53). An analogous story, of a sleeve being cut off so as not to disturb a sleeping cat, is told of both Confucius and Muhammad, and perhaps others.

Yútáo — remains of a peach, from the story of a favourite who rather too familiarly offered his sovereign a peach of which he had already eaten half. (From Han Fei Zi, chapter 12)

Bōlí, literally "glass", but implies "glass person". It comes from a passage in the Dream of the Red Chamber in which Phoenix is described as having a "crystal heart in a glass body," meaning that she was glistening, pure, clear, fastidious, etc. It stands as high praise for a lady, but comes off as an effeminate slur when referring to men. The English translation of Bai Xian-yong's novel about male homosexuals in Taiwan includes the term "crystal boys," derived from the same passage in the earlier novel, and also a rather gruff reference to the old photographer who befriends some of the boys as "you old glass," which, delivered by a female friend of his, comes out sounding about on the level of "you old fart," i.e., not really so very offensive, but indicating a passing mood of aggravation on the speaker's part. Nevertheless, the general meaning is probably closer to "old queer."

Nán fēng, male custom, is homophonous with (southern custom.) The first writing of the term would fairly easily be picked out as referring to sexual interactions, whereas the second term could just mean "the customs of the southern part of China."

Tóngzhì was recently adopted in Hong Kong and Taiwan to mean homosexual, and is sometimes used on the mainland. Literally the term means "one having same aspirations".

Tùzi, used to refer to catamites. (See Herbert A. Giles, A Chinese-English Dictionary, entry 12,122) See also Tu Er Shen.

Since the success of Ang Lee's Brokeback Mountain, duànbèi (lit. "Brokeback") has also become popular.

See also 

 Baidu 10 Mythical Creatures
 Cantonese profanity
 Diu (Cantonese)
 Grass Mud Horse
 Chinese Internet slang
 List of Internet phenomena in China

References

Footnotes

Sources and further reading

  
 Oedipus Lex: Some Thoughts on Swear Words and the Incest Taboo in China and the West
 
 Cool Jay
 
 Chinese sex words, obscene language, curses and slang
 Tianmi.info
 Modern Chinese Slang at Thinking Chinese.
  Huang, Frank and Wolfram Eberhard (1968), "On Some Chinese Terms of Abuse," Asian Folklore Studies 27.1: 25–40. Items gathered from Taiwan-Chinese of Fujian  origin, Min-nan dialect group), but many also common in North China.

Sexual slang
Profanity
Profanity by language